The 2018–19 ISU Short Track Speed Skating World Cup was a multi-race tournament over a season for short track speed skating. The season began on 2 November 2018 in Canada and ended on 10 February 2019 in Italy. The World Cup was organised by the ISU who also runs world cups and championships in speed skating and figure skating.

The World Cup consisted of five competitions this year.

Calendar

Men

Calgary 2–4 November 2018

Salt Lake City 9–11 November 2018

Almaty 7–9 December 2018

Dresden 1–3 February 2019

Torino 8–10 February 2019

Women

Calgary 2–4 November 2018

Salt Lake City 9–11 November 2018

Almaty 7–9 December 2018

Dresden 1–3 February 2019

Torino 8–10 February 2019

Mixed

Calgary 2–4 November 2018

Salt Lake City 9–11 November 2018

Almaty 7–9 December 2018

Dresden 1–3 February 2019

Torino 8–10 February 2019

World Cup standings

See also
 2019 World Short Track Speed Skating Championships

Notes

References

External links 
 ISU.org World Cup Schedule
 Official results

ISU Short Track Speed Skating World Cup
Isu Short Track Speed Skating World Cup, 2018–19
Isu Short Track Speed Skating World Cup, 2018–19